Salam al-Bey, also called the Beylical Hymn, was the national anthem of Tunisia between 1846 and 1957 during the Beylik of Tunis and the Kingdom of Tunisia. It was sung in honour of the Bey of Tunis, who reigned over the country.

Initially without words, Arab words were written by an unknown poet and French words adapted to the melody of the hymn. According to historian Othman Kaak (quoted by Salah El Mahdi), the music was composed by Giuseppe Verdi, but Salah El Mahdi himself disputes this information.

The hymn was temporarily replaced as the national anthem by the Ala Khallidi after the end of the monarchy and the proclamation of the republic on 25 July 1957.

Lyrics 

Historical national anthems
National symbols of Tunisia
Royal anthems
Tunisian music
Tunisian culture
Tunisian monarchy
African anthems
Year of song missing
1844 songs